Roberts Pass is a paved multi-use trail in Madison County in the U.S. state of Ohio. Along with the Prairie Grass Trail it serves as the Madison County segment of the  Ohio to Erie Trail. Bicyclists, hikers, runners, rollerbladers and other groups such as bird watchers and nature lovers have the opportunity to explore the natural beauty of Central Ohio as the trail weaves its way across the county.  The entire length of the Roberts Pass Trail is part of the Great American Rail-Trail, U.S. Bicycle Route 21 and U.S. Bicycle Route 50.

History
Roberts Pass was intended to be included as part of the Prairie Grass Trail.  Due to the difficulty of getting right of way, it was thought this section would remain on country roads.  As the result of herculean efforts of local volunteers, the right of way was secured and a work lane cleared for later construction.  In a local campaign to rename this special section of trail; Bill Young, one of the original members of the Friends of Madison County Parks and Trails, coined the term “Roberts Pass” which were the last names of two of the organization’s leaders.  On June 4, 2005 the House of Representatives of the 126th General Assembly of Ohio renamed that section Roberts Pass in honor of (and to the surprise of) Wayne Roberts and Gene Pass.  A memorial plaque is mounted on a stone along the trail near Maple Street that briefly records this story.

Location
West terminus at London: 
East terminus west of Lilly Chapel (and west terminus of Camp Chase Trail):

Route
The surface is asphalt and much of the trail has trees on both sides. To the west of Maple Street, the Ohio to Erie Trail follows a signed street route SW across London where it connects to the Prairie Grass Trail at Midway Street on the west side of London.

Future Route
The current signed street route through London is handy to find local amenities, however, it is the intentions of the City of London and local enthusiasts to eventually have an off-street route across London through the historical downtown area.  Right-of-way issues continue to delay this off-street route project.

Communities adjacent to the trail
 South Charleston – Prairie Grass Trail
 London
 Lilly Chapel – Camp Chase Trail

Local Attractions
Outdoor
 Roberts Pass Trailhead
 Madison Lake State Park
 Madison County historical courthouse.
 London historic downtown area
 Cowling Park
 Community swimming pool
 Prairie Grass Trailhead
 Madison County Fairgrounds with campground
Indoor
 Madison County historical museum
 London art gallery
 Various restaurants

Milestones
 June 4, 2005 the House of Representatives of the 126th General Assembly of Ohio officially named the trail section "Roberts Pass" in honor of Leaders of Friends of Madison County Parks and Trails, Wayne Roberts and Gene Pass.  
 October 2010 Construction was completed on the Roberts Pass Trailhead on the east side of London.

See also
 Ohio to Erie Trail
 Camp Chase Trail

References

External links
 Friends of Madison County Parks and Trails
 Ohio to Erie Trail Map

Bike paths in Ohio
Rail trails in Ohio
Hiking trails in Ohio
Central Ohio Greenways